Billie Jean King defeated Maria Bueno in the final, 6–3, 3–6, 6–1 to win the ladies' singles tennis title at the 1966 Wimbledon Championships. Margaret Smith was the defending champion, but lost in the semifinals to King.

The second round match in which Gail Sherriff beat her sister Carol was the second match between sisters in the ladies' singles draw at Wimbledon, the first being in the 1884 Wimbledon Championships when Maud Watson beat Lillian. The next Wimbledon match between sisters in the singles draw was in 2000 between Serena and Venus Williams.

Seeds

  Margaret Smith (semifinals)
  Maria Bueno (final)
  Ann Jones (semifinals)
  Billie Jean King (champion)
  Nancy Richey (quarterfinals)
  Annette Van Zyl (quarterfinals)
  Françoise Dürr (quarterfinals)
  Norma Baylon (third round)

Draw

Finals

Top half

Section 1

Section 2

Section 3

Section 4

Bottom half

Section 5

Section 6

Section 7

Section 8

References

External links

Women's Singles
Wimbledon Championship by year – Women's singles
Wimbledon Championships
Wimbledon Championships